Fazelabad (also Romanized as Fāẕelābād; formerly, Feyzabad, also Romanized as Feyzābād) is a city and capital of Kamalan District, in Aliabad County, Golestan Province, Iran. At the 2006 census its population was 13,060, in 3,154 families. The people of Fazelabad speak a dialect of Mazanderani language called Katoli.

References 

Populated places in Aliabad County
Cities in Golestan Province